Chandan Singh Chauhan is an Indian politician from Uttar Pradesh. He is serving as  member in 18th Uttar Pradesh Assembly since 10 March 2022 from Meerapur representing Rashtriya Lok Dal. He is son of RLD politician Sanjay Singh Chauhan and Grandson of Chaudhary Narain Singh.

References 

Living people
Rashtriya Lok Dal politicians
People from Muzaffarnagar district
Uttarakhand MLAs 2022–2027
Year of birth missing (living people)